The 2001–02 Wessex Football League was the 16th season of the Wessex Football League. The league champions for the second time in their history, and the second consecutive season, were Andover. Runners-up Fleet Town were promoted back to the Southern League at the second attempt, but Swanage Town & Herston finished bottom and were relegated for the second time, the first being in 1996.

For sponsorship reasons, the league was known as the Jewson Wessex League.

League table
The league consisted of one division of 23 clubs, the same as the previous season, after Portsmouth Royal Navy were relegated and one new club joined:
Portland United, joining from the Dorset Combination League.

References

Wessex Football League seasons
8